The  is a large pumped-storage hydroelectric power plant in Shimogō, Minamiaizu, Fukushima Prefecture, Japan.

The facility is run by Electric Power Development Company (J-Power).
Like most pumped-storage facilities, the power station uses two reservoirs, releasing and pumping as the demand rises and falls. The Ouchi Dam Reservoir, formed by the Ouchi Dam, is the upper artificial reservoir, while Okawa Dam forms the lower reservoir.

Ogawa Dam is a rockfill-concrete gravity combined dam, with a height of 75 m and a length of 406 m. Construction on the dam started in 1971 and was completed in 1987. The dam is also used for flood control, irrigation, and domestic and industrial water supply.
Ouchi Dam is a rockfill dam with a height of 102 m and a length of 340 m. Construction started in 1974 and was completed in 1991.
The power plant employs four 250 MW pump/generator units, for a total net capacity of 1000 MW. The maximum water flow is 314 cubic meters per second. Unit 1 and 2 became operational in April 1988 after the completion of the Okawa Dam. Units 3 and 4 were commissioned in 1991.

The station includes a visitor center with a model of the power station and media to explain its operation.

The plant, operated by Tohoku Electric Power Company, has an installed capacity of 21 MW and an effective head of 56 m. The maximum water flow is 45 cubic meter per second. The plant operates with a single Kaplan turbine.

See also 

 List of power stations in Japan
 Hydroelectricity in Japan
 List of pumped-storage hydroelectric power stations

Notes

Dams in Fukushima Prefecture
Pumped-storage hydroelectric power stations in Japan
Energy infrastructure completed in 1988
1988 establishments in Japan